John Barrowman is the self-titled third studio album by musician and actor, John Barrowman. Released on 1 March 2010, the album entered the UK Albums Chart at number 11. This was the highest chart rating of any of Barrowman's albums to date.

Track listing

References

2010 albums
Covers albums